Leybold is a German surname. Notable people with the surname include:

Friedrich Leybold (1827–1879), German-Chilean pharmacist and naturalist
Hans Leybold (1892–1914), German expressionist poet

See also
Leibold
Leybold GmbH, vacuum technology company based in Cologne, Germany

German-language surnames